Behind The Player: Paul Gray is an instructional video by Slipknot's late bassist, Paul Gray. Released on November 1, 2008 through IMV the DVD features a brief overview of Gray's musical history, in-depth lessons on how to play bass for two Slipknot songs, as well as other bonus material. Gray gives a walk through of the bass sections for the tracks "Duality" and "Surfacing"; there is also a jam session which features Stone Sour drummer Roy Mayorga and a video tab for both tracks.

Contents
Behind The Player
Gray talks about his background in music including his history as a guitar player and a bassist, how he met the other members of Slipknot, his musical influences and his bass setup.

"Duality"
Lesson
Jam
Video tab

"Surfacing"
Lesson
Jam
Video tab

Special features
Voliminal: Inside the Nine trailer
Disasterpieces trailer
Little Kids Rock promotional video

Personnel

Paul Gray - lesson leader
Roy Mayorga - special guest drummer
Slipknot - music
Ken Mayer - producer
Sean E DeMott - producer
Leon Melas - director
Rick Donaleshen - executive producer
Ken Barrows - director of photography
Tim Harkins - sound engineer
Jeff Morose - editor
Matt Chidgey - mixer
Cedrick Courtois - mixer
Thayer DeMay - graphics, transcription
Mike Chateneuf - camera
Keith McNulty - camera
Chris Shaw - camera
Doug Cragoe - camera
Tyler Bourns - technical director
John Parker - gaffer
Matt Pick - assistant director
Laine Proctor - production assistant
McNulty Nielson - lighting, grip
Shawn Crahan - photography, video
Neil Zlozower - photography
Gene Kirkland - photography
Arthur Seay - photography
Roxanne Robinson - photography
Dean Karr - photography
James Clynes - photography
Roadrunner Records - video
Daryl “B.Tongs” Arnberger - video
Arthur Seay - video
Bill Fold - video
Joe Lester - video
James Clynes - video

References

External links

Behind the Player
Slipknot (band)